Kosteryovo is a town in Petushinsky District of Vladimir Oblast, Russia, located on the Lipnya River (Klyazma's tributary),  west of Vladimir, the administrative center of the oblast. Population:

History
It was founded as a settlement serving the railway station of the same name, which opened in 1890. It was granted town status in 1981.

Administrative and municipal status
Within the framework of administrative divisions, Kosteryovo is directly subordinated to Petushinsky District. As a municipal division, the town of Kosteryovo is incorporated within Petushinsky Municipal District as Kosteryovo Urban Settlement.

Facilities
There is a cultural center, a museum, and a music school in the town.

References

Notes

Sources

Cities and towns in Vladimir Oblast
Sudogodsky Uyezd